Articles 315 to 323 in Part XIV of the Constitution of India provides for the establishment of Public Service Commission for the Union of India and a Public Service Commission for each State. The same set of Articles (i.e., 315 to 323 in Part XIV) of the Constitution also deal with the composition, appointment and removal of members, power and functions and independence of a Public Service Commission. Union Public Service Commission (UPSC) to conduct examinations for recruitment to the "All India Services" (AIS) and the "Higher Central Services" (HCS) and to advise the President on disciplinary matters. State Public Service Commission in every state to conduct examinations for recruitment to state services and to advise the governor on disciplinary matters.

Public service commissions exams

Union Public Services Commission exams

Gazetted Group A and B jobs exams

 Union Public Service Commission, for Gazetted  Group A and B jobs 
 Civil Services Examination (India) (CSE)
 Engineering Services Examination (ESE)
 Central Armed Police Forces Examination (CAPF)
 Combined Defence Services Examination (CDSE)
 Combined Medical Services Examination (CMSE)
 Indian Police Service Limited Competitive Examination (IPS LCE)
 Special Class Railway Apprentice (SCRA)

Non-Gazetted Group B, C, D jobs exams 

 National Recruitment Agency (NRA), for Non-Gazetted Group B, C, D jobs
 Railway Recruitment Control Board (RRCB)
 Staff Selection Commission (SSC)

 Central Selection Board of Constable (CSBC)
 Central Civil Services (Group B) (UPSC)

State-wide Public Services Commissions exams

Union government non-UPSC exams

Armed forces Commissioned officers jobs - SSB exam  

 Services Selection Board (SSB)

PSU exams 

Public sector undertakings (PSU) and banking, etc jobs are as follows:

 Institute of Banking Personnel Selection (IBPS)
 Joint Employment Test (JET Exam), for Lekhpal, account officers, govt depts or PSU jobs

Higher education entrance exams 

 National Testing Agency (NTA), for admission to higher education Common University Entrance Test
 Common Management Admission Test (CMAT) 
 Common University Entrance Test (CUET) 
 Graduate Pharmacy Aptitude Test (GPAT)
 Joint Entrance Examination - Main (JEE Main), Following are not conducted by NTA but by respective institutes after the JEE
 Graduate Aptitude Test in Engineering (GATE)
 Indian Science Engineering Eligibility Test (ISEET)
 Joint Management Entrance Test (JMET)
 Joint Entrance Examination - Advanced (JEE Advanced) - Conducted by IITs and not by NTA
 National Eligibility cum Entrance Test (Undergraduate) (NEET UG)
 National Eligibility Test (NET)

See also

Civil Services of India
Imperial Civil Service

References

Indian public service commissions
Union Public Service Commission
 
Civil Services of India
India government-related lists